Trevor Harvey (7 September 1916 – 24 July 1988) is a former Canadian soccer player. He was a four-time national champion, winning titles with the Westminster Royals FC (1936), Vancouver Johnston National Storage FC (1937), and North Shore United FC (1938 and 1949). He was posthumously named an honoured member of the Canada Soccer Hall of Fame.

He notably won the Canadian Championship in three successive seasons with three different teams from 1936 to 1938. He was the hero of the 1938 series, a five-game series with Timmins' Dome Mines club.

While he was predominantly a centre half, he could also play just about any position on the forward line, too. In 1942–43, he led the Pacific Coast League in goalscoring (he was the first player to surpass the 20-goal plateau after the league was re-established in 1939-40).

In 1985, Harvey was inducted into the BC Sports Hall of Fame.

References

External links
 / Canada Soccer Hall of Fame
Canada Soccer Hall of Fame
Canada Soccer Records & Results

1916 births
1988 deaths
Canada Soccer Hall of Fame inductees
Canadian soccer players
Soccer players from Vancouver
Association football midfielders
Westminster Royals (soccer) players